S v Zuma and Others was the first case decided by the Constitutional Court of South Africa after it was established in 1995. The case dealt with a provision of the Criminal Procedure Act which required the defence in criminal cases to prove that a confession made before a magistrate was coerced, rather than requiring the state to prove that it was not coerced. The court held that this reverse onus provision was unconstitutional because it violated the right to a fair trial under section 25 of the Interim Constitution.

External links
 Text of the judgment
 Official media summary

Constitutional Court of South Africa cases
South African criminal case law
1995 in South African law
1995 in case law